Samuel Oluwatimilchin Adetokunbo Folarin (born 23 September 2000) is an English professional footballer who plays as a winger for League Two club Harrogate Town.

Style of play
Folarin originally played at right-wingback when he was at Tooting & Mitcham United but was converted to a striker after moving to Middlesbrough.

Club career
Folarin started his career in the youth ranks at Wandsworth Town before moving to Tooting & Mitcham United in search of senior first team football. After a breaking into the first-team in the 2018–19 season, he was offered a trial at Charlton Athletic but was not signed by the London club. After a subsequent trial at Middlesbrough, Folarin was offered a contract along with team-mate Isaiah Jones.

On 15 September 2020, Folarin debuted for Middlesbrough in the EFL Cup in a 2-0 defeat versus Barnsley at the Riverside Stadium.

On 26 January 2022, Folarin joined Scottish Championship club Queen of the South on loan, for the remainder of the 2021-22 season.

Career statistics

References

2000 births
Living people
English footballers
Association football wingers
Tooting & Mitcham United F.C. players
Middlesbrough F.C. players
Queen of the South F.C. players
Isthmian League players
English Football League players
Scottish Professional Football League players
Black British sportspeople